The Constitution Society is an independent, non-party educational trust based in Westminster, London. It was established in 2009 to promote public understanding of the British Constitution and to work to encourage informed debate between legislators, academics and the public about proposals for constitutional change. The Constitution Society does not take any position on the merits of specific reform proposals but opposes ill-considered, piecemeal constitutional change. Alongside its focus on constitutional issues, The Constitution Society supports initiatives which aim to improve the quality of government and legislation generally in the UK.

History
The Constitution Society was founded in 2009 by Nat le Roux. It has expanded significantly since its inception and has influenced the national discussion of constitutional issues on several occasions. In 2017, Sir Malcolm Jack was appointed as the first President of The Constitution Society. In 2020, The Constitution Society started its own regular blog, which provides commentary on topical constitutional issues from a range of expert contributors. It continues to publish in-depth reports and provide support to a number of other initiatives.

Aims
The Constitution Society aims to improve understanding of the British constitution amongst the general public. Though neutral about substantive constitutional issues, The Constitution Society strongly supports due process and good government. It believes that constitutional change should only be introduced to address genuine deficiencies, and only after careful analysis and broad consultation, with adequate time for scrutiny and debate in Parliament, and not merely to serve the political interests of the government of the day. The Constitution Society believes that constitutional bills should be subject to a more rigorous parliamentary process than other types of legislation.

Activities

Notable publications
The Constitution Society regularly publishes papers by leading experts on a wide range of constitutional topics. Constitution Society papers have been cited in Select Committee reports, parliamentary debates and commented on in the media.

In April 2021, The Constitution Society published Union at the Crossroads: Can the British state handle the challenges of devolution? The report examined the UK government's approach to the multi-level territorial constitution since devolution. It identified a number of deficiencies in the machinery and culture of central government and was recognised as a major contribution to the debate on the future of the UK Union.

The Constitution Society published Good Chaps No More? Safeguarding the Constitution in Stressful Times by Andrew Blick and Peter Hennessy in November 2019. The paper looked at whether the so-called 'good chap' principle was coming under increasing strain and set out a number of possible ‘protective mechanisms’ for the UK constitution. It has since been cited in House of Lords debates.  

The Constitution Society has also contributed to the debate around electoral systems and reform. In April 2019, it published The Electoral System and British Politics  which analysed the practical impact of the 'First-Past-the-Post' electoral system, arguing that it no longer delivers the outcomes its advocates claim.

The Constitution Society also produced several Brexit-related publications after the referendum in 2016 which examined, amongst other things, the legal implications, legislative options and a paper by Richard Rawlings on the impact on intergovernmental relations, since cited by Lord Wigley. It has also looked at the place of referendums within the UK’s constitutional system more generally.

Further notable report topics have included: the role of the House of Lords; constituency boundaries and electoral registration; the Human Rights Act 1998 and judicial review; the possibility of a UK Constitutional Convention; and data and democracy in the digital age. 

The Constitution Society also regularly submits evidence to parliamentary Select Committee inquiries.

United Kingdom Constitution Monitoring Group
In February 2021, The Constitution Society announced that it was supporting a new initiative: the United Kingdom Constitution Monitoring Group (UKCMG). Made up of a group of experts and practitioners, the UKCMG's principal purpose is to assess developments in the UK constitution. The initiative covers areas including government accountability; arrangements for upholding the rule of law and individual rights; the territorial governance of the UK; and how the key aspects of such issues can be distilled and communicated to the public. The UKCMG has submitted evidence to several parliamentary Select Committee inquiries and published a statement of 20 principles expressing what the Group sees as the core values underpinning the proper operation of the UK system of governance.

External links

The Constitution Society provides financial support for the United Kingdom Constitutional Law Association (UKCLA). UKCLA is the United Kingdom’s national body of constitutional law scholars affiliated to the International Association of Constitutional Law. Its objective is to encourage and promote the advancement of knowledge relating to UK constitutional law, broadly defined, and the study of constitutions generally.

The Constitution Society is a registered charity.

References

Charities based in London
2009 establishments in the United Kingdom
Think tanks based in the United Kingdom
Educational organisations based in the United Kingdom
Think tanks established in 2009
Constitution of the United Kingdom